Theophory is the practice of embedding the name of a god or a deity in, usually, a proper name. Much Hebrew theophory occurs in the Bible, particularly in the Old Testament. The most prominent theophory involves names referring to:
 El, a word meaning might, power and (a) god in general, and hence in Judaism, God and among the Canaanites the name of the god who was the father of Baal.
 Yah, a shortened form of Yahweh.
 Levantine deities (especially the storm god, Hadad) by the epithet baal, meaning lord. In later times, as the conflict between Yahwism and the more popular pagan practices became increasingly intense, these names were censored and baal was replaced with bosheth, meaning "shame".

El theophory
The following is an alphabetical list of names referring to El and their meanings in Hebrew:

Abdiel – Servant of God
Abiel – God my Father
Abimael – A Father sent from God
Adbeel – Disciplined of God
Adiel – Witness of God
Adirael – Magnificence of God
Adriel – Flock of God
Advachiel – Happiness of God
Ambriel – Energy of God
Ammiel – People of God
Ariel, Auriel – Lion of God
Armisael – Mountain of Judgment of God
Azael – Whom God Strengthens
Azazel – God Strengthens or Arrogant to God
Azrael – Help of God
Barakiel, Baraquiel – Lightning of God
Barachiel, Bardiel – Kindness of God or Ray of God
Bethel – House of God
Betzalel – Shadow/Path of God
Bithiel – Daughter of God
Boel – God is in Him
Chakel – Wisdom of God
Chamuel – He who Seeks God
Cassiel – Speed of God or God is my anger
Castiel - My Cover is God
Denzel – Fortress of God
Daniel – Judged by God or Judgement of God
Elad – God Forever
Eliana – My God Answers
Elijah (Elias) – Whose God is Jah, God Jah, The Strong Jah, God of Jah, My God is Jah. Reference to the meaning of both  (Eli)-(Jah)
Elisha – Salvation of God
Elishama – My God Hears
Elishua – God is my salvation
Eliezer – My God Helps
Elimelech – My God is King
Elizabeth – My God is Oath
Elkanah – God has Possessed, or God has Created
Emmanuel – God is with us
Ezekiel – God will Strengthen
Ezequeel – Strength of God
Ezrael – Help of God
Gabriel, Gavriel – Man of God, God has shown Himself Mighty, Hero of God or Strong one of God
Gaghiel – Roaring Beast of God
Gamaliel – Reward of God
Hamaliel – Grace of God
Hanael – Glory of God
Harel – Mountain of God
Isabel – God is my oath
Immanuel – God with us
Imriel – Eloquence of God
Iruel – Fear of God
Ishmael, Ishamael – Heard by God, Named by God, or God Hearkens
Israel, Yisrael – Struggles with God or Prince of God
Jekuthiel – God will support
Jerahmeel – God's exaltation
Jeremiel – God's mercy
Jezreel – God will sow
Joel – Jah is God
Jegudiel – Glorifier of God
Katriel – Crown of God
Kazbiel – He who lies to God
Kushiel – Rigid One of God
Lee-El, Lee-el, Leeel – For God
Leliel – Jaws of God 
Lemuel – Dedicated to God
Mahalalel – The blessed God, The shining light of God, or The glory of God
Malahidael – King of God
Matarael – Premonition of God
Michael – Who is like God? a question
Mishael – Who is what God is? a question
Nathanael, Nathaniel – Given by God or God has Given or "Gift of God"
Nemuel – Day of God
Nuriel – Fire of God or Light of God
Othniel – Hour of God
Peniel, Penuel, Phanuel – Face of God
Priel – Fruit of God
Rachmiel – God is my Comforter
Ramiel/Remiel – Thunder of God
Raphael – God is Healing or Healing one of God
Raziel – Secret of God
Rameel – Mercy of God or Compassion of God
Reuel – Friend of God
Sachiel – Price of God or Covering of God
Sahaquiel – Ingenuity of God
Samael – Venom of God
Samiel – Blind God, epithet for Baal or the Demiurge
Samuel – Name/Heard of God
Sariel – Command of God
Sealtiel – Intercessor of God
Shamsiel – Lonely Conqueror of God
Shealtiel – I asked God [for this child]
Suriel – Moon of God
Tamiel – Perfection of God
Tarfiel – God Nourishes
Tzaphkiel – Beholder of God
Tzaphquiel – Contemplation of God
Uriel – Sun of God, Light of God or Fire of God
Uzziel – Power from God
Verchiel – Shining of God
Yophiel – Beauty of God
Za'afiel – Wrath of God
Zadkiel – Righteousness of God (rabbinic)
Zagzagel – Splendor of God
Zaphkiel – Knowledge of God
Zeruel – Arm of God
Zophiel – Watchman of God
Zuriel – Rock of God

Incorrect El theophory
The name Abel, which appears to refer to El, in fact is not an instance of theophory.

The name Jael also appears to refer to El in English, but contains ayin rather than the aleph of El.

The name Eli also appears to refer to El in English, but contains ayin rather than aleph.

The name Rachel also appears to refer to El in English, but contains chet.

Shaddai theophory
The following is an alphabetical list of names referring to Shaddai and their meanings in Hebrew:
Zurishaddai – Shaddai is my rock

Yah theophory
The following is an alphabetical list of names referring to Yah/Yahweh and their meanings in Hebrew:
Abiah – Yahweh is my father
Abijah – Yahweh is my father (2 Chron. 13:3)
Adaiah – ornament of Yahweh
Adonijah – my lord is Yahweh
Ahaziah – vision of Yahweh
Ahiah – brother of Yahweh
Ahijah – brother of Yahweh
Amariah – Yahweh says; integrity of Yahweh
Amaziah – strength of Yahweh
Ananiah – Protected by Yah
Athaliah – Yahweh is exalted
Azariah – Yahweh has helped
Batyah – Daughter of Yah
Bealiah – Yahweh is Lord
Dodavah(u) – Beloved of Yahweh
Elijah – My God is Yah, God Yah. Reference to the meaning of both  (Eli)-(Yah)
Hananiah – Yahweh is gracious
Gedaliah – Yahweh is great
Hezekiah – Yahweh has strengthened
Hodaviah/Hodiah – Give thanks to Yahweh, The splendour of Yahweh
Isaiah – Salvation of Yahweh
Isshiah – Yahweh exists
Jaden/Yahden – Yahweh has heard
Jeconiah – Yahweh has firmly established
Jedaiah – Yah knows
Jedidiah – Beloved of Yah
Jehiah – Yahweh lives
Jehoiachin – Yahweh is firmly established
Jehoiada – Yahweh knows
Jehoshaphat – Yahweh is judge
Jehosheba – Yahweh is my oath
Jehozadak – Righteous is Yahweh
Jekamiah – Yahweh raises
Jeremiah – Yah exalts
Jeshaiah – Salvation of Yahweh
Jesse – Yahweh exists
Joab – Yahweh is father
Jochebed – Yahweh is glory
Joel – Yahweh is El/God
John – Yahweh is gracious
Jonathan – gift of Yahweh
Joseph – Yah has increased
Joshua – (Yahoshua, Jesus) – Yahweh saves/is (my) Saviour/Salvation or Yahweh is lordly (Niqqud dependent)
Josiah – supported of Yahweh
Malchijah – Yahweh is king
Micaiah – Who is like Yahweh
Matityahu – Gift from Yah
Neariah – Servant of Yahweh
Nedabiah – Yahweh impels
Nehemiah – Yah comforts
Nethaniah – gift of Yahweh
Netanyahu – gift of Yahweh
Obadiah – Yahweh's servant or worshiper
Odelia – Thanks to Yah
Pedaiah – Redemption of Yahweh
Pelatiah – Yah has delivered
Pelaiah – Yah has distinguished
Pelaliah – Yah has judged
Pekahiah – Yah has observed
Reaiah – Yahweh has seen
Rephaiah – Yah has healed
Seraiah – Servant/prince of Yahweh
Shecaniah – One intimate with Yahweh
Shephatiah – Judged of Yahweh
Toviah – Good of Yahweh or Yahweh is Good
Uriah – My light is Yahweh
Uzziah – Yahweh is my strength
Zebadiah, Zabdi – Gift of Yahweh
Zedekiah – justice of or righteous is Yahweh
Zephaniah – Yahweh hides or protects
Zechariah – Yahweh remembers

Baal theophory
Ba'al is a generic term meaning master; it can also be translated "Lord". In the Bible, it is frequently a reference to Hadad, although it is sometimes used to refer to other specific deities, including Yahweh, and on other occasions is used to refer to an arbitrary lord of this area.

The following is an alphabetical list of names referring Ba'al, and their meanings in Hebrew:
Baal – master; lord
Baalah – her lord; she that is governed or subdued; a spouse
Baalath – a rejoicing; our proud lord
Baalath-Beer – subjected pit
Baal-berith – lord of the covenant
Baale – same as Baalath
Baal-gad – lord Gad, or lord of Gad, or lord of fortune/felicity
Baal-hamon – he who rules a crowd
Baal-hanan – Ba'al is gracious
Baal-hermon – lord of destruction / of a cursed-thing
Baali – my lord; lord over me
Baalim – lords; masters; (later Jewish use: false gods)
Baalis – a rejoicing/proud lord
Baal-meon – lord/master of the house
Baal-Peor – master of Peor; master of the opening
Baal-perazim – lord of divisions
Baal-shalisha – the lord that presides over three; the third idol
Baal-tamar – master of the palm-tree
Baal-zebub – lord of the fly (satirical corruption of Ba'al-zebul - lord of princes)
Baal-zephon – the lord/possession of the north/hidden/secret
Jerub-baal the lord contends

Bosheth
In later biblical and Jewish writing, some of the theophories in Ba'al were bowdlerised, with ba'al replaced by bosheth ((the) shameful (thing)):
Ishbosheth, from Ishba'al, man of ba'al.
Jerubbeshet, from Jerubbaal "Ba'al contends"
Mephibosheth, from Mephibaal "from the mouth of Ba'al"

Yam theophory
Yam is the Canaanite god of the Sea.

Abiyam – My father is Yam (1 Kgs. 14:31)

Zedek theophory
Zedek (or Sydyk or Sedek) was the name of a Phoenician deity worshiped in Canaan. In Hebrew, "tzedek" (from the root tz-d-k) means "righteous".
 
The following is an alphabetical list of names referring Zedek, and their meanings in Hebrew:

Melchi-zedek – My king is Zedek
Adoni-zedek – My lord is Zedek
Rabi-zedki – My great one/master is Zedek (EA 170)

Hadad
Apart from oblique references to Hadad by means of the word ba'al, some theophory references him directly:
Hadadezer - Hadad is my help
Rib-Hadda - Great is Hadad

Others
Asenappar - Ashur is creator of an heir
Nebuchadnezzar - Nabu, preserve my firstborn son
Sennacherib - Sin has replaced brothers
Shalmaneser - Shulmanu is the best

See also 
 List of Biblical names

Notes

References 

Bible
Biblical topics